Ray Franz is a former member of the Michigan House of Representatives first elected in November 2010 and re-elected in 2012. He was term-limited in 2016 and was succeeded by fellow Republican Curt VanderWall.  Ray Franz advertised his political campaign mostly in northern michigan (Traverse City, Interlochen, ect) mostly by signage and door to door advertising.

Franz was raised in Detroit, Michigan. He graduated from the University of Detroit and then served in the United States military in Vietnam. In 1978, he moved to Manistee County, Michigan where he was involved in running a grocery business. Franz also owned and operated Franz Market for 30 years, and served for three decades on the Onekama Village Council, including six years as village president.

References

Living people
University of Detroit Mercy alumni
Members of the Michigan House of Representatives
21st-century American politicians
Year of birth missing (living people)